William Bayles (8 January 1896 – 17 December 1960) was an Australian cricketer. He played one first-class match for Tasmania in 1913/14.

See also
 List of Tasmanian representative cricketers

References

External links
 

1896 births
1960 deaths
Australian cricketers
Tasmania cricketers
Cricketers from Tasmania